Sant Llorenç de Morunys is a municipality in the comarca of the Solsonès in Catalonia, Spain. It is situated in the Lord valley in the north of the comarca below the pyrenean massif of Port del Comte. The shrine of Lord is located in an exclave of the municipality between Guixers and Navès. The town is served by the L-401 road between Coll de Nargó and Berga.

The medieval walls of the town and four of the gateways have been preserved. The eleventh-century church of Sant Llorenç is a protected historico-artistic monument.

A Benedictine Monestir de Sant Llorenç de Morunys was built in the 11th century, continuing the romanesque architecture.

Demography

References

 Panareda Clopés, Josep Maria; Rios Calvet, Jaume; Rabella Vives, Josep Maria (1989). Guia de Catalunya, Barcelona: Caixa de Catalunya.  (Spanish).  (Catalan).

External links
Official website 
 Government data pages 

Municipalities in Solsonès
Populated places in Solsonès